SIL, Sil and sil may refer to:

Organizations
 Servis Industries Limited, Pakistan
 Smithsonian Institution Libraries
 SIL International, formerly Summer Institute of Linguistics
 Apex Silver Mines (former American Stock Exchange ticker symbol)
 Societas Internationalis Limnologiae, now International Society of Limnology
 Society for Individual Liberty
 Scooters India Limited

Science and technology
 Solid immersion lens for microscope
 Standard Interchange Language, for information exchange between software
 Software-in-the-Loop, in software testing; see Association for Standardisation of Automation and Measuring Systems
 STIL or SIL, a human gene
 Surge impedance loading of electrical transmission lines
 Squamous intraepithelial lesion
 Safety Integrity Level of a safety function
 Speech Interference Level, an acoustical parameter
 SIL Open Font License

Fiction
 Sil (Doctor Who), a villain in the TV series
 Sil, a character in the film Species
 Silvio Dante, a character in The Sopranos

People
 Narasingha Sil (born 1937), historian
 Sil Campusano (born 1965), a former baseball player
 Sil Austin (1929–2001), American jazz saxophonist
 Sil, member of the Dutch rap-metal band Urban Dance Squad
 Silvy De Bie or Sil (born 1981), Belgian singer
 Sil, project name of Dutch house musician Olav Basoski (born 1968)

Places
 Sil (river), Galicia, Spain
 Sile (river), Italy, also called Sil
 Sil (village), a small village on the northwestern part of Soledar, Ukraine.

Transport
 South Island line, Hong Kong

Other uses
 Tumulung Sisaala (ISO 639-3 language code), a language
 Silence-Lotto (UCI code), a bicycle racing team
 SIL code, a 3-letter language code used by SIL International
 sister-in-law

See also
 Sill (disambiguation)
 Sils (disambiguation)
 CIL (disambiguation)